Gubbata is a locality in the Central West region of New South Wales.

The area now known as Gubbata, lies on the traditional lands of the Wiradjuri people. The name, Gubbata, is most likely a settler rendering of an Aboriginal language word.

The Village of Gubbata was proclaimed in December 1930, around the time that the surrounding area was opened up for  farming and the railway line was opened. Some of the new farming blocks were reserved for soldier settlers. It never grew to the expectations held for it in the early 1930s, Nonetheless, there was a small settlement established there. 

It is on the Naradhan Railway Line. The station opened 11 Feb 1929 and closed to passengers 4 May 1975. There was a siding with a loading bank, but the nearest bulk grain silo was built adjacent to the next station, at Kikoira, in 1933.   

Gubbata had a public school, from June 1934 to 1946, and again, from September 1961 to February 1983. It also had a post office, by 1934, which closed on 31 July 1981. Like many small communities, it had a public hall. 

Mines in the area included two underground gold mines, the Blairgowrie Mine and the Gubbata Mine just off the Naradhan Road. However, the discovery of tin nearer to the neighbouring village of Kikoira, in 1938, led to that village becoming a larger and longer-lasting settlement than Gubbata. Little now remains of the village.

As the village was surveyed and only partially settled, the native scrub in the village reserve was left largely intact while the surrounding area was cleared for agriculture. This remnant area is the basis of the Gubbata Nature Reserve. The reserve is dominated by pointed mallee, congoo mallee and yorrel. Some spinifex and scrub cypress are also present.  "The reserve is managed to maintain the sample of mallee habitats in an area that is largely cleared, which requires minimal visitation."

References

External links
w

 Map of Parish of Blairgowrie, County of Dowling (NSW Dept. of Lands)

Towns in New South Wales